Gheorghe Pănculescu might refer to:

Gheorghe Pănculescu (engineer), Romanian engineer
Gheorghe Pănculescu (general), the last Romanian World War I veteran